Count William I of Nassau-Siegen (10 April 1487 – 6 October 1559), official titles: Graf zu Nassau, Katzenelnbogen, Vianden und Diez, nicknamed ‘the Elder’ or ‘the Rich’, was since 1516 Count of Nassau-Siegen (a part of the County of Nassau) and of half Diez. He descended from the Ottonian Line of the House of Nassau.

During his reign William introduced the Reformation in his countries. But the most important issue during most of his reign was the dispute over the succession in the County of Katzenelnbogen with the Landgraviate of Hesse.

William had a calm, balanced personality, but also a persistent character. He was firm and unwavering in his religious convictions, and steadfast and persistent in fighting for his rights in the Katzenelnbogische Erbfolgestreit. Because of his prudent administration, he was a beloved ruler among his subjects. And his diplomatic strength of persuasion earned him a large number of mediation assignments in the Holy Roman Empire.

William’s reign was one of the most remarkable periods in the history of his house. He managed to significantly expand the territorial possessions of his county several times, and prepare others. The separation of the churches, and in its wake his acceptance and introduction of the Lutheran religion, led to his involvement in the political dealings of his time, the Schmalkaldic League, the religious disputes and the Peace of Passau. Under difficult circumstances, with political wisdom and experience, he managed to protect the interests of his house through courage combined with moderation and thereby laid the foundations for its later flourishing. In Dutch history however, he is mainly known as being just the father of Prince William ‘the Silent’.

Biography

Early years

William was born in Dillenburg on 10 April 1487 as the fourth and youngest son of Count John V of Nassau-Siegen and Landgravine Elisabeth of Hesse-Marburg. At William’s baptism his mother’s uncle, Archbishop Herman IV of Cologne, was present. William spent most of his youth in Siegen. He trained himself in the use of weapons, received a bow at the age of six and a pair of spurs two years later. The horse fairs and stallion farms of the County of Nassau were famous, so William and his eldest brother Henry rode horses a lot. William often stayed with his parents in the County of Vianden, which was owned by the Nassaus, where French and German were spoken. The familiarity with both languages that the child learned here, served him well later on. When William was ten years old, he was sent ‘zu hoff’ (‘to court’) in Heidelberg, where he learned Latin quickly and well and where he probably established the good relations with the Electorate of the Palatinate that lasted all his life. In his early youth, William travelled extensively through the German lands, which included a visit at the court of Elector Frederick III ‘the Wise’ in Saxony, where he established important relations for the time to come.

Since 1499, William’s eldest brother Henry stayed at the court of his childless uncle Engelbert II of Nassau in Breda and Brussels. The latter provided for his further education and bequeathed his possessions in the Netherlands to him upon his death in 1504. In that same year William’s older brother John died, leaving William the sole heir of his father.

In the War of the Succession of Landshut (1504–1505), William earned his first military laurels as captain of a Nassau cavalry squadron. At the Imperial Diet in Cologne in 1505, he met the aged Emperor Maximilian I. From there, he accompanied Elector Frederick III of Saxony to Arnhem, where he met Walburga of Egmont. In 1506, the marriage was arranged at Siegen with a messenger from Count John III of Egmont, and shortly afterwards the marriage was consummated at Koblenz. The glorious wedding was attended by the archbishops Herman IV of Cologne and John II of Trier and many other guests from the high nobility. Henry, the groom’s brother, had come over from the Netherlands. Shortly before, on 16 February 1506, the ʻBeilagerʼ of William’s sisters Elisabeth and Mary, who married the counts  and Jobst I of Holstein-Schauenburg-Pinneberg respectively, was celebrated in Dillenburg with the greatest of festivities. The purchase of gold fabric for 747 guilders and silk fabric for 396 guilders at the trade fair in Mainz for these celebrations, as well as the unusually high total expenditure of 13,505 guilders in the accounts of 1505/1506, show that these weddings must have been splendid events. Soon after the wedding, William set up his own court at Dillenburg Castle. There, he had laid the foundation stone for the tower facing the valley of Dillenburg on 23 March. In August 1506, he had body armours made for himself and five servants in Frankfurt.

Count of Nassau-Siegen and Diez
When his father died in 1516, William inherited his properties. The county covered about 1,600 square kilometres. About 37,500 inhabitants lived in 15 cities and 550 villages. The regular income at that time is estimated at less than 50,000 guilders (from taxes, service fees, tolls, etc.). The county was an agricultural area. Pigs were raised on the Kalteiche, which benefited from the large oak forests. The Westerwald was known for its good horse and cattle breeding, in Herborn wool weaving flourished (28,990 sheep are mentioned for 1544), but the main source of all income came from the mountains, from the iron ore of the Sieg and Dill regions. The Counts of Nassau regularly received the iron ore tithes from the mines and smelting rents from the smelters. The latter was levied in various ways, partly as compensation for the fief of the land on which the smelter stood, partly as a tax on the use of the watercourse, which was on loan from the territorial lord. As probably the most important citizens of the state, the hammer smiths of Siegen were very soon granted exemption from feudal duties and, from about 1539, paid 24 raderguilders a year for this instead of the hitherto usual ʻreisigen Pferdesʼ. Until 1555, the count himself owned many iron smelters, and in the Dillenburg district he retained his influence even after 1555. Naturally, the counts cared about the welfare of the iron industry, the countryʼs main source of income. They never got tired of discussing with iron workers price regulations, wages and working times as well as trying out new technical processes. 

When in 1520 the counts united in associations or ʻKorrespondenzenʼ divided into two large districts, of the Netherlands and of the Wetterau, William was put in charge of the latter. Knowledge about the economic, political and spiritual consequences of this countsʼ alliance is so limited that it is probably underestimated. The leading position in these ʻGrafenkorrespondenzʼ was almost always held by members of the House of Nassau. Of particular importance were certain toll agreements by this Wetterauer Grafenverein, which almost foreshadowed a Western toll union. This toll union had already been established in the Wetterau by Emperor Frederick Barbarossa and had withstood political and territorial changes. Although in 1354 only half of the County of Nassau belonged to the Wetterau (the Siegerland had been allocated to the district of Westphalia), the entire county benefited from the toll agreements because the count was a member of the Wetterauer Grafenverein. Within this toll union, a simple declaration was enough to transport provisions, fruit, grain, oat, meat, wine, butter, cheese and iron freely. The designation of iron as the only non-agricultural product shows the importance of this toll union for Nassau, and especially for the iron trade from the Siegerland. In 1515, a new expansion of the toll area led to the abolition of several Rhine tolls and opened the way for iron from the Siegerland to reach Antwerp and other markets where the people of the Siegerland, as subjects of Nassau, could take advantage of the more favourable market conditions. This expansion of the toll area even brought benefits for production, as the import duties for charcoal from the County of Wittgenstein and the Freier Grund, which partly belonged to the County of Sayn, were abolished.

The justice system continued in the forms adopted in the 16th century. Several times a year, the Schützen (town watchers) had to put offenders in the tower or, for less serious offences, in the ‘Hundskrapf’, or have a hand in the torture and execution of criminals. The most common method of execution was probably hanging; the gallows at that time stood not far from Dillenburg on the Galgenberg. The hangings did not always take place in Dillenburg. In 1546, one was held in Ebersbach, as had often been the case in the past, with the participation of Schultheißen from Dillenburg. On the other hand, Schultheißen from Herborn were often involved in the hangings in Dillenburg, who were then subsequently entertained by the city. 

In 1518, William became Rat und Diener (counsellor and servant) of the Emperor. In this capacity, he attended Charles Vʼs election as Roman King in Frankfurt. William quickly gained prestige and influence. In Charles Vʼs war against King Francis I of France in 1521–1522, William took part in the Imperial Army. In the summer of 1521, he participated with a cavalry squadron in the Siege of Mézières, led by his brother Henry. When William’s baby daughter Magdalene was baptised in November 1522, guests at  included his friend Count Philip II of Hanau-Münzenberg and his young bride Countess Juliane of Stolberg-Wernigerode.

Because of his prudent administration, he was a beloved ruler among his subjects. This was evident, for instance, during the German Peasants’ War of 1524–1525 in which violent excesses occurred in numerous places in Germany, but from which Nassau was largely spared. On 18 May 1525, William wrote to his brother Henry in the Netherlands that the whole of southern Germany was ablaze with peasant revolt and that he was very worried about it: ‘Meine Bauern sind gottlob noch ruhig und zufrieden, aber das Wetter ist allenthalben um mich her.’ (‘My peasants are thankfully still calm and content, but the bad weather is all around me.’). One can conclude from this that the treatment and situation of the peasants in Nassau was humane and bearable. William was too much a child of his times and of his social class not to have helped his threatened fellow princes against the peasants by sending some of them a Nassau auxiliary corps ʻwider den uffruhrʼ (‘against the revolt’). Nevertheless, he enjoyed a certain respect among the peasants as a just territorial lord. The Hessian Amtmann Balthasar Schrautenbach wrote that the Franconian peasants wanted to expel Landgrave Philip I ‘the Magnanimous’ of Hesse and put William in his place. The peasant writer Sigle is said to have given courage to his people by saying that as soon as the landgrave turned against them, ‘der reiche Nassau’ would come into the country. Thus even then William was nicknamed ‘the Rich’.

William himself was a cautious large landowner. Whereas his father had already taken great interest in strengthening his position as territorial lord by acquiring the largest possible amount of his own property in farmsteads, meadows and arable land, William strove to expand and complete his land holdings especially around Dillenburg.

In 1526, Prince John Frederick of Saxony and his father, Elector John ‘the Steadfast’ of Saxony, visited William in Siegen. He was asked to convey for the prince his marriage proposal to Princess Sibylle of Cleves.

In 1528, William was concerned about his local industry. He regulated the working hours of iron smelters and banned hammer smiths from working at night. He also ordered iron to be marked before it was sold, creating one of the earliest (if not the earliest) hallmarks for steel. On 9 October 1528, the Emperor approved his appointment as governor of Luxembourg, but William refused to accept the office.

In 1529, William’s wife Walburga died and was buried in Siegen. His brother Henry suggested the widower to look for a new life companion in the highest princely houses and suggested a princess of Lorraine, ʻdie ein gut heiratgut mitbrächteʼ (‘who brought in a rich marital estate’). In the same year, William’s friend Philip II of Hanau-Münzenberg died. The latter left behind underage children, over whom Willem took custody. There were regular exchanges between William, the widower in Siegen, and Juliane, the widow in Hanau. Matters of faith were also discussed, as Hanau had embraced Martin Lutherʼs teachings early on.

On 20 September 1531, the marriage of William and Juliane took place in the hall of Siegen Castle. The marriage was conducted according to the Catholic ritual. The baptism of their eldest son, William, on 4 May 1533 also took place according to Catholic tradition, a full mass with Latin formulas, with the use of salt, which symbolised the doctrine of faith, and with a real exorcism of the devil. Through this marriage, William acquired ¼ of the County of Diez (of which he already owned half) in 1535, which had been in the possession of the Eppstein family. Lord Eberhard IV of Eppstein-Königstein, the brother of William’s mother-in-law, died childless in 1535. His family had acquired this property in 1420 through the marriage of Lord Godfrey VII of Eppstein-Münzenberg to Countess Jutta of Nassau-Siegen.

In these years of great spiritual decisions, when Luther’s translation of the Bible was first published, when Ignatius of Loyola founded the Society of Jesus, when Thomas More was beheaded in England, in short, in the years when politics and religion became intertwined, William was engaged in a large number of mediation assignments. To remain completely free in his decisions, he refused the highest honours offered to him, for instance the position of commander in the Imperial Army and the position of Imperial Statthalter in the Duchy of Württemberg in 1532, and even the Order of the Golden Fleece in 1533. He refused this order, which Charles V wanted to grant him, because its statutes demanded the Catholic religion of its members.

On 10 January 1531, the Schmalkaldic League had been founded by the Protestant Elector John of Saxony, Duke Ernest I of Brunswick-Lüneburg, Landgrave Philip I of Hesse, Fürst Wolfgang of Anhalt-Köthen, the counts of Mansfeld and several minor Imperial Estates. After Duke Ulrich of Württemberg, supported by Philip of Hesse, recaptured his lands in 1534, most members of the Wetterauer Grafenverein joined the league, including William. On 10 January 1536, he committed to contribute to and cooperate with everything the league would decide (because of the Katzenelnbogische Erbfolgestreit, Philip of Hesse protested against William’s admission).

William issued several decrees for the economical, social and ethical benefit and advancement of his subjects. Despite his country being beset by threats of war throughout his reign, he instructed his officials by various mandates to ensure that the land peace renewed by the Emperor on various Imperial Diets was maintained in his county and that all troublemakers, vagrants and beggars were taken into the strictest custody. The wool purchasing ordinance promulgated by William on 19 May 1536 served to revive domestic wool weaving by strictly prohibiting the sale of sheep wool to foreign buyers and regulating in detail the countryʼs trade by weight and price. And the ordinance promulgated on 10 December 1538 for artisans, wagoners and day labourers regulated in detail wages and working hours in summer and winter; working hours were set from four o’clock in the morning to seven o’clock in the evening in summer and from five o’clock in the morning to six o’clock in the evening in winter. In the spring, the wagoners were only allowed to use their horses and wagons for arable farming. William was also already thinking about a more generous meat supply for his country. Pig breeding lagged especially in times of poor acorn harvest. In such years, he bought fat pigs from abroad.

Due to the Katzenelnbogische Erbfolgestreit, however, the county became increasingly entangled in debt. The shortage of timber and charcoal led to an economic downturn that hit the iron industry particularly hard. William issued wise decrees demonstrating his thorough knowledge of the industrial situation. In October 1538, he himself became a shareholder in the Gewerkschaft of the famous  at  near Hilchenbach in Siegerland. Eleven years later, when two other shareholders filed suit against William, he did not rule as sovereign, but let the ordinary mountain court judge. When the court ruled in his favour, the plaintiffs appealed. In the new proceedings, in which William again did not intervene, a judgement was passed against him.

Despite the debts, the many baptisms and weddings were celebrated extensively. Probably the most splendid of these baptisms, the ecclesiastical and secular course of which has been preserved for almost all of William’s children, was that of his third son Louis, born on 10 January 1538, who was baptised by Count palatine Louis V in the presence of Archbishop Herman V of Cologne. The number of guests at this feast was so large that Dillenburg Castle could not accommodate them all.

Times forced William to carefully build up an armament industry. As early as around 1540, he had research conducted in Siegen into whether the iron from Wissenbach could be hammered into sheet iron (for body armours and the like) and planned the construction of new Plattenhämmer, i.e. sheet metal factories, for which he employed sheet metal smiths from the Olpe disctrict on 25 March 1540. The fire of the small border fortress and the village of Freudenberg in July 1540 probably boosted these plans. William had the houses hastily rebuilt, while the damaged castle was repaired more slowly.

His diplomatic strength of persuasion earned William another mediating role in 1540 in the succession dispute in the Duchy of Guelders between Emperor Charles V as Duke of Burgundy and Duke Antoine of Lorraine. As Antoine completely disregarded William’s advice, he then permanently lost the Duchy of Guelders and the County of Zutphen. For the aid granted at the Imperial Diet of Speyer in 1542 against the Turks, William had provided a military contingent. That contingent under Junker Johann von Selbach-Crottorf arrived in Raab in 1542, but did not have to get involved in the fighting. For the same purpose William paid a larger sum in 1544.

During the Siege of Saint-Dizier in Champagne in July 1544, René of Chalon, the only son of William’s eldest brother Henry, was hit in the right shoulder by a musket bullet. He died the next day in the arms of Charles V. In the holographic will drawn up by René, he had stipulated that the eldest son of his uncle William became universal heir to all his properties, unusually bypassing his uncle, most probably because of his Lutheran sympathies. The counsellors of Charles V did object to this succession on the grounds that William had Protestant tendencies. But the Emperor decided to honour René’s will, albeit on condition that the young heir would be removed from his parental authority and brought up as a Catholic in the Netherlands. William did not hesitate to accept this arrangement, since, like his son in his later career, he was more inclined to consider his dynastic interests than his religious beliefs. On 13 February 1545, Charles V formalised the arrangements.

William did not take part in the war of the Schmalkaldic League against Duke Henry V of Brunswick-Wolfenbüttel. The growing power of his opponent Philip of Hesse in the league forced William to be wary of violence and was one of the reasons why he did not take part in the Schmalkaldic War against the Emperor, which broke out in 1546. William was clever enough to execute the recruitment of 600 horsemen for the Imperial Army entrusted to him. He thus escaped the punishment inflicted on his cousins from the Walramian Line and the other members of the Wetterauer Grafenverein. And although he had by now clearly placed himself on the Protestant side, he nevertheless still had such an influence with the Catholic Emperor that time and again many tried to win favour with Charles V through him. William attended the Imperial Diet in Augsburg in 1548.

William was concerned about the developing relationship between the German princes and King Henry II of France. Henry II invited William to Butzbach in March 1551 to take sides. But William remained steadfast and neutral. As the senior of the House of Nassau, he had to consider both the German possessions and the threatened areas of his son the Prince of Orange located in France, the Principality of Orange itself and in the Franche-Comté. If in a coming dispute the German princes were to prevail with the King of France, Philip of Hesse would seize the County of Katzenelnbogen and Henry II would seize the Principality of Orange and its possessions in the Dauphiné and the Provence, totalling more than 800 cities, villages, castles and farmhouses, which yielded around 57,000 livres a year in annuities. This did not even include the Principality of Orange itself. On 3 October 1551, the German princes united in Lochau against the Emperor. They demanded and got a declaration of neutrality from the Wetterauer Grafenverein. The only member not to sign this declaration was William. He stayed in the mighty fortress of Dillenburg with among others troops from Breda, preparing for a Hessian-Saxon attack. Also in Siegen, the city walls were checked and the towers re-equipped. The guilds had to enrol and train the able-bodied men. In short: Nassau was in highest state of alert. Messengers went from Dillenburg and Siegen to Breda with secret messages and coded letters. In these days of highest activity, it was significant that Magister Wilhelm Knüttel acted simultaneously as secretary to Count William of Nassau and to his eldest son Prince William of Orange, i.e. all the threads of Nassau politics were in one hand. Some historians claim that William, because of his knowledge of the French language, was the spokesman for the German princes at Fontainebleau, who, in exchange for his help against the Emperor, assured the French king of sovereign rights as imperial vicar over the bishoprics of Metz, Toul, Verdun and Cambrai, thus relinquishing these cities to France. Such a course of action would have been nonsensical in his situation, and no contemporary chronicler mentions Williamʼs participation. This claim is based solely on the dubious memoirs of the French marshal de Vieilville, Sire de Scépaux. These were not written until after 1584 and not printed in Paris until 1756–1763, i.e. long after the death of Prince William of Orange, to whom and whose house they undoubtedly wished to do harm. Count William of Nassau would thus have given up his neutrality, which he had sought to maintain for so long. And why else did he have himself represented at the following yearʼs Fürstentag in Passau by his brother-in-law Count Louis of Stolberg-Königstein? In addition, he also stayed at home when almost all members of the Wetterauer Grafenverein rushed to the Imperial Army to recapture Metz.

The renewed shepherding ordinance for Dillenburg promulgated by William on 1 February 1552 was, like his fatherʼs ordinance, intended to protect the fields and forests during communal grazing and limited the maximum number of sheep for anyone ‘der im Thal Dillenburg Schafe halten will’ (‘who wants to keep sheep in the valley of Dillenburgʼ) to 25, instead of the earlier 50. On 12 September 1555, William sold to the citizens of the city and the subjects of the district of Siegen the iron trade of the countʼs iron smelters, with the exception of the iron smelter at Freudenberg, where he reserved for himself an annual iron smelting period of 12 weeks. This was the beginning of a monopoly on the iron trade, almost independent of the territorial lord. The citizens never used the freedoms granted to them to the detriment of the count, nor did the latter use his rights to the detriment of his subjects.

William issued a large number of decrees aimed at the moral uplift of his subjects who, despite all previous measures, continued to return to their old vices. Since excessive spending on family celebrations provided particular opportunity for this, William tried to put an end to intemperance at child baptisms, weddings, funerals and guild meetings through strict regulations. To prevent revels and Sunday desecration, residents were obliged to close pubs at a surprisingly early hour, eight oʼclock in summer and seven oʼclock in winter. The countʼs ordinance of 19 December 1555 stipulated ‘daß über die bestimmte Zeit, wenn abends die Weinglock geläutet ist, kein Wirt länger weder über die Schwell hinaus oder auch sunsten seinen Gästen im Hause Wein reichen oder zapfen soll’ (‘that after the stipulated time, when in the evening the wine bell is rung, no innkeeper shall serve or tap wine to his guests in the house, nor over the threshold, nor otherwiseʼ), because otherwise ‘viel Unrats, Mord, Totschlag, Unzucht und alle Untugend gemehret und überhand nimmt, wie neulich ein schrecklich Exempel und Totschlag sich derhalber zugetragen’ (‘much mischief, murder, manslaughter, fornication and all immorality will increase and prevail, as recently a terrible example and manslaughter took place therebyʼ). A particularly strict order issued by William on 7 July 1556 was against dancing. Dancing was generally forbidden in the county on Sundays and holidays. For weddings, permission was given only if the mayors and bailiffs gave permission and the dance took place in the presence of elders, a councillor, the town clerk or the court clerk at the town hall. Dancing was allowed only ‘mit Geigen und Lauten, nicht auf der Gasse mit Trommeln, Schalmeien und Sackpfeien’ (‘with violins and lutes, not on the street with drums, shawms and bagpipes’), no longer than two hours in the afternoon and one hour after supper, and ‘alle Unordnung ungeschickt und unzüchtig springen, verdrehen, herumbwerffen, zanken und schreyen’ (‘all disorderly and immoral jumping, twisting, overturning, arguing and shouting’) was to be avoided. One ordinance of William that characterised him as a profound and far-sighted sovereign was his ban on marriages between relatives: ‘Dieweil es etzo unter unseren Untertanen gemein wird, dass die Eltern ihr Kind in Verwandt-, Blutfreundschaft und Schwagerschaft im vierten Glied vermählen, daß doch im Rechte verboten’ (‘Because it is now customary among our subjects for parents to marry off their child in kinship, blood relationship and consanguinity in the fourth degree, which is forbidden by law’), the friends of both parties, when agreeing on a marriage, ‘sich erstlich der Sippschaft halben gründlich erkundigen, ob und wie nahe die Personen einander verwandt, und so die Verwandtnis zwischen ihnen im dritten oder vierten Glied bestände, alsdann soll dieselbig Ehe ohn unser Wissen und Willen nicht beteidingt, geschlossen noch zugelassen werden’ (‘first of all thoroughly inquire into the kinship, whether and how closely the persons are related to each other, and if the kinship between them is in the third or fourth degree, this marriage shall not be concluded or allowed without our knowledge and will’).

Introduction of the Reformation

Shortly after the beginning of Williamʼs reign, the Augustinian monk Martin Luther initiated the movement of minds from which the Protestant Church emerged with his Ninety-five Theses in 1517. After Elector Frederick III ‘the Wise’ of Saxony, Lutherʼs patron, it was especially Landgrave Philip I ‘the Magnanimous’ of Hesse who had introduced the new doctrine to his country. The Reformation would soon take hold in Nassau too. William, through his repeated stays at the court of the Elector of Saxony and his friendship with the young prince and later Elector John Frederick I, had made an early acquaintance with the professor from Wittenberg. As early as 1518, under the influence of Lutherʼs theses, William had tried to control the sale of indulgences in his country by having Archbishop Albert of Mainz order his subcommissioner Johann Breydenbach to stop the sale of indulgences, which had begun in Nassau, especially in the Siegerland.

At the Imperial Diet of Worms in 1521, William was an eyewitness to Lutherʼs appearance before Emperor Charles V and the Empire. It is not known whether he spoke to the reformer, but he was – like everyone at the time – intensely engaged with Lutherʼs ideas. However, he did not yet show any overt adherence to Lutherʼs teachings, which is understandable given the great influence exerted on him by his brother Henry, a staunch supporter of the Emperor and the Catholic Church.

Shortly after his visit to William in 1526, John Frederick I of Saxony, in a letter dated 16 May from Torgau, sent William some of Luther’s writings, to make of him, as he wrote, ‘mit göttlicher Hilfe einen guten Christen’ (‘with divine help a good Christian’). Only then did he give the new doctrine more space; tightened regulations on church discipline and the prohibition of individual practices of the Catholic Church marked the beginning of a kind of reformation, which, however, left all essential points untouched for the time being. Henry considered it his duty to repeatedly remind his brother of the dangers he was exposing himself and his house to by abandoning the old faith (‘und sult nu zweilei glauben in einem haus sein, so kan E.L. wol ermessen, wie sich das zusammen schicken wurde, das mich besser vermieden dunkt’ (‘and now if there were two faiths in one house, E.L. can properly judge how such a thing would be put together, which I think is better to avoid’)). These warnings, in view of the already three-decade-long Katzenelnbogische Erbfolgestreit, in which the Emperor was Nassau’s most powerful and almost sole supporter, did not fail to have an effect on William, but neither were they able to dissuade him from his increasingly strong inclination towards Luther’s doctrine. William had a calm, balanced personality, but also a persistent character. Once he had convinced himself of the truth of the new faith, he embraced it wholeheartedly.

In 1530, William attended the Imperial Diet of Augsburg, where the Protestant princes presented the Emperor their Bekenntnis (the Confessio Augustana). Also present in the Emperor’s entourage was William’s brother Henry. The latter’s secretary Alexander Schweis received the protest note for the Emperor. Immediately after William’s return, were ‘die religion und kirchengebräuch zue Dillenbergk … geendert und die meß abgestellt’ (‘the religion and church customs in Dillenburg … changed and the mass ended’). That is, he formally introduced the Augsburg Confession and abolished celibacy and mass. Rather than rushing, William set to work cautiously and gradually, forced to do so not only by the necessary consideration with the Emperor and his brother Henry, but also by the ecclesiastical relations in his own county. Although at that time the Siegerland had hardly more than 20,000 inhabitants and the number of parishes did not exceed 30, the relatively low level of education, not only among the broad masses, but especially among the clergy themselves, made rapid progress impossible. He therefore initially initiated religious renewal only in the county’s two main cities, Dillenburg and Siegen, by replacing, in October 1530, the two previous parish priests, who had voluntarily retired in exchange for a mercy salary, with two representatives of the new doctrine. These were Heilman Bruchhausen from Krombach (usually called Heilman Krombach) and Leonhard Wagner from Kreuznach. Heilman Krombach, who had already been in William’s service as court chaplain since March 1529, became the first minister of the city of Dillenburg. For himself and his family however, William still found it more beneficial to keep the old faith outwardly, all his sons were still baptised according to Catholic tradition, and he himself obtained a papal dispensation from Lent as late as 1531. William patiently allowed almost all the county’s clergy to remain in their posts, although quite a few of them, due to their incompetence and reprehensible lifestyles, others also due to their contrary attitude to Lutheran doctrine, proved to be no useful helpers in the new work. During this time of transition, the lack of suitable clergy in his own county became especially noticeable, and William was forced to look for the necessary replacements elsewhere, in which the old relations with Saxony worked out favourably. It was mainly through the mediation of Philipp Melanchthon, who maintained a lively correspondence with William’s counsellor Wilhelm Knüttel, that a pupil of the two great reformers from Wittenberg, Erasmus Sarcerius from Annaberg in Saxony, came to the county as a helper. Sarcerius became not only the actual completionist of the Reformation, but also the new creator of the county’s school system. With the church orders of 1532 (after the example in Brandenburg-Ansbach) and 1536 (after the church order of Nuremberg), and the church agenda of 1537, Lutheranism was organised in Nassau-Siegen. In 1536, William appointed Sarcerius as rector of the Latin school in Siegen, in 1537 as court preacher and superintendent, and in 1541 as spiritual inspector of the entire county. During regular synods and church visits, this eminent scholar and skilled organiser reorganised the entire church system of the county on a Protestant basis.

In 1543, Melanchton stayed in Siegen. Archbishop Herman V of Cologne, whose brother  had married William’s sister Elisabeth, sought William’s advice. The archbishop had tried in vain to bring the Archbishopric of Cologne to the Reformation, had then been deposed by papal bull, and now William, as a friend of the Emperor, was asked to put in a good word for him. With the Wied Family, the archbishop spent several weeks in Siegen.

In 1548, William had to let Sarcerius go because the Augsburg Interim no longer allowed him to do his so successful work in the spirit of Luther. With the Interim (an imperial decree), the Emperor ruled that the Catholic doctrine was to be upheld until a general council was held and that the Lutheran Imperial Estates were to restore their former religious status within six months. William had to introduce the Interim in his county, which was again subordinated to the Archbishopric of Trier. The Interim evoked strong reluctance in the county, as it did elsewhere. Many parishes were now without pastors; but since the Catholic Church was unable to fill all vacant parishes with its priests, the former Protestant clergy mostly returned to their old posts. This remained so, especially after the Peace of Passau in 1552 abolished the Interim and the Peace of Augsburg in 1555 granted the Protestant German Imperial Estates freedom of religion and the right to determine the religion of their subjects in their territory.

The Katzenelnbogische Erbfolgestreit
The most important issue in William’s political life was the dispute over the succession in the rich County of Katzenelnbogen, the Katzenelnbogische Erbfolgestreit. For decades, this succession dispute lasted between Nassau and the Landgraviate of Hesse and took a heavy toll on William’s country. Large were the expenses both for the countless court cases and for the rebuilding of Dillenburg Castle into a strong fortress in which soldiers remained stationed for years to withstand any attack by the opponent. The County of Katzenelnbogen was situated between the Taunus and the River Lahn and was very rich due to the possession of a large number of Rhine tolls between Mainz and the border of the Netherlands. The county consisted of Rheinfels, Sankt Goar, Braubach, Hohenstein, Darmstadt, Zwingenberg, Rüsselsheim and Umstadt, as well as Eppstein, the district of Driedorf and parts of Diez, Hadamar, Ems, Löhnberg, Camberg,  and Wehrheim. The last seven possessions were jointly owned with the Counts of Nassau.

After the death of John V in 1516, his sons Henry and William continued the case with increasing vigour. The former’s high position and close personal relationship with Roman King Charles V as an educator, general and advisor gave the Nassaus powerful support in this protracted legal battle. On the other side stood their energetic opponent, the young Landgrave Philip I ‘the Magnanimous’ of Hesse. He had an advantage because Hesse had gained control of the entire disputed territory, which gave him a strong position over the small County of Nassau; in addition, powerful imperial princes, such as Elector Frederick III ʻthe Wiseʼ of Saxony, were on his side as allies.

In 1520 Charles V referred the dispute from the Reichskammergericht to the Reichshofrat. This seemed to be very favourable, because Alexander Schweis from Herborn, who was Henryʼs secretary, served as a judge in the latter court. It was probably also due to Henryʼs great influence on Charles V that the case was also discussed at the Imperial Diet of Worms in 1521. But there was no final decision there either. A commission consisting of the Prince bishops Christoph of Augsburg, George of Bamberg and William III of Strasbourg was given the task of re-examining the case, which had been handled by the most important legal scholars of the time. The verdict, to which both parties had unconditionally submitted in advance, was handed down in Tübingen on 9 May 1523. It was favourable to William and awarded him almost the entire inheritance. Shortly before, on 17 January 1523, his mother Elisabeth of Hesse-Marburg, the original heiress, had died. Charles V openly sided with William, but whatever decrees Charles sent from Burgos – Philip of Hesse ignored them. The Emperor was far away in Spain. In 1527, an imperial commission visited Siegen because of the dispute with Hesse. But the complicated political and religious circumstances of the following period, the wars Charles V had to fight first against France and the Turks, which kept him out of the Holy Roman Empire for a long time, and later against the Protestant princes united in the Schmalkaldic League, on the one hand gradually reduced the Emperorʼs interest in the Nassau cause, all the more so since Henry died in 1538 and William was leaning more and more openly towards the Protestant side, and on the other hand gave the all-too-well in political action schooled Hessian landgrave repeatedly the opportunity to thwart the transfer of the County of Katzenelnbogen to Nassau.

In the course of the dispute, armed raids on Dillenburg Castle were repeatedly planned. Shortly after the Tübingen verdict was announced, in June 1523 William had to fear that Philip ‘gegen ihn mobil gemacht habe, um ihn zu überziehen und zu verjagen’ (‘had mobilised against him in order to overrun him and drive him out’). On 1 September of the same year, he wrote to his brother Henry: ‘der lantgraf rüst sich ernstlich, thut ein Aufgebot über das andere und lest sich oeffentlich hoeren, er wolle mich verjagen’ (‘the landgrave is seriously arming himself, issuing one summons after another and is publicly announcing that he wants to expel me’). At the same time, William asked for at least 2,000 guilders, which he urgently needed for defence. A similar situation arose in 1525 and again in 1528, when Philip again took up arms with Saxony to get the County of Katzenelnbogen permanently in his hands. Then, too, William expected a surprise attack on Dillenburg. William not only had  and the Eschenburg occupied with his countrymen to protect his border against Hesse, but also, from about 1525, had Dillenburg Castle put in the strongest state of defence. He had new bastions built and equipped with cannons. In any case, major fortifications had been under construction since 1525, as a letter from Henry dated 2 February 1526 shows:‘Mir hat E.L. bot angezeigt, wie ir den thorn in Dillenburg oben im schloß und fast anders habt abwerfen, abgraben, verendern, bessern und stark machen lassen und des noch täglich im Werk seid. Dweil ich nu der vorigen gestalt und gelegenheit des schloß wol wissen hab, so bit ich E.L. wull mir das schloß wie ir das nu gemacht habt und zu machen fürhabt, mit den jetzigen veranderungen und befestigungen, sovil muglich, thun entwerfen und zuschreiben, damit ich das auch sehen und versteen muge.’ (‘I have been shown by E.L.’s messenger how you have had the tower in Dillenburg at the top of the castle and almost everything else removed, excavated, repaired, improved and reinforced, and how it is still in progress daily. As I am only well acquainted with the former form of the castle, I request E.L. to design and describe to me the castle, as you have now made it and intend to make it, with the present alterations and fortifications, as far as possible, so that I may also see and understand it.’).

At that time, construction of the ‘Hohen Mauer’ (‘high wall’) began under the leadership of Utz or Ulrich von Anspach, who had been Burgrave of  since 1516. Given the slowness of work at the time, it must have taken years to complete such a colossal structure, 300m long and 20m high, which still looks like a marvel of fortress construction today. In December 1531, the construction of the wall was still in full swing, as William wrote to his brother that he had ‘den schweren Grundbau zur Vest erst angefangen, der noch gantz ungeendet und große Vorsehung erheischt’ (‘had only just begun the heavy foundation work for the fortress, which is still entirely unfinished and requires great foresight’). On 24 May 1533, he again described to him his difficult situation: because the landgrave ‘allenthalben an ihn stoße, könnte er nit wohl sicher aus seinem Haus reiten oder gehn’ (‘collided with him everywhere, he could not safely ride or go out of his house’) and was therefore ‘zu einem bau und festung höchlich verursacht’ (‘compelled to a construction and fortification in a high degree’). How justified William’s fears were is particularly evident at this time from the landgrave’s attitude towards him as a member of the Schmalkaldic League, which the Protestant Imperial Estates had established to protect their faith from the Catholic party. Philip regarded William as his ‘ergsten und hochsten feind und widerwertigen’ (‘worst and greatest enemy and adversary’) and in 1535 called him a ‘papistischen Diener’ (‘papist servant’), who, like his brother Henry, was ‘dem huse zu Burgundi anhengig’ (‘subservient to the House of Burgundy’) and wanted to deprive him of ‘dem mehrsten und besten teil seines ererbten fürstentums lande und leute’ (‘the largest and best part of his inherited princely land and people’). Meanwhile, the protracted court case had consumed a fortune, and there was no end in sight to the resulting expenditure. Defences and constant preparedness against Hesseʼs threats were also eroding the countyʼs capital strength. William must have regarded his nickname ʻthe Richʼ as scorn in those years. For the continuation of the massive construction work money was always lacking. Even on 27 March 1536, William asked for an allowance of 20,000 guilders to purchase gunsmiths, guns, gunpowder, bullets and a sufficient garrison in the castle. The construction, which was very difficult for him, had to be completed, otherwise all other armament would be in vain. Henry promised his brother 10,000 guilders, but could only give the messenger 1,600-2,000 guilders for now, which could only ‘zur munition und bau und nit an andere Dinge verschwendet oder angelegt werden dürfen’ (‘be spent or invested on munitions and construction and not on other things’). From 1539, alongside Ulrich von Anspach was artillery master Johann Opferkampf, who at that time not only supervised all the artillery at the castle, but also cast his own cannons from models he had made in the count’s carpentry workshop. In 1547, a cistern was also constructed as a precaution for a siege. As early as 1529, a fountain stood in the centre of the castle’s courtyard.

In the autumn of 1551, when threatening news reached Dillenburg again and a new invasion was to be feared, especially since, as William wrote to his son Prince William of Orange on 6 December 1551, ‘man aus dem land zu Hessen in einem tag vor Dillenburg rucken könne’ (‘one could get from the land of Hesse to Dillenburg in one day’), Johann Opferkampf was hastily sent to the Netherlands ‘um 50–60 guter Kriegsleute auf das Haus zu bestellen und anzuwerben’ (‘to order and recruit 50–60 good soldiers for the castle’) and at the same time urgently requesting money, gunpowder and a gunsmith. His recruitment was successful, as from early 1552 there were 60 Dutch soldiers at Dillenburg Castle, some of whom stayed there until July. At this time, the city church was also included in the fortification system of the castle and, as can still be clearly seen in the oldest images of the city, the cemetery wall was equipped with firing holes. Precautions were also taken for the security of the city at this time. The city account of 1550/51 mentions not only the conclusion of a contract with masons for the extension of the city gate, but also the expenses for four masons who worked on this gate for 74 days, in addition to about 20 residents who broke stones, threw sand and made food, and for wagoners, who brought stones and wood to the construction site with an escort crew of 52 men.

However successful William was in his role as mediator, in his own case he could not easily obtain his rights and his inheritance. Several times the opponents met to agree on an amicable settlement, but time and again Philip of Hesse broke his word. But he did not keep this promise either. Often the weapons threatened to speak. That is why William could never stop arming himself. The fact that there was never a Hessian attack on Dillenburg was mainly due to the extremely strong fortification of the castle, whose impregnable high wall made it unassailable at the time.

After years of fruitless negotiations, an agreement with Hesse was finally reached in Frankfurt on 30 June 1557 through the mediation of Electors Otto Henry of the Palatinate and Augustus of Saxony and the Dukes Christoph of Württemberg and William V of Jülich. Hesse paid 600,000 guilders to Nassau (which was less than 10% of Nassau’s claims from 1555, recognised by several imperial judgements), but ceded for 150.000 guilders to Nassau: the Hessian share of the County of Diez (¼) (which had been sold by the Lords of Eppstein to the Counts of Katzenelnbogen), the districts of Camberg (¼), Altweilnau, Wehrheim (¼), Driedorf, as well as half of Hadamar (i.e. Castle, city and district of Herborn were freed from the ancient Hessian fealty and came entirely to Nassau. 450,000 guilders was to be paid by Hesse in cash and paid in such a way that 150,000 guilders was due on 28 December 1557, the remaining 300,000 guilders from 1559 to 1564 in annual payments of 45,000 guilders, the remainder of 30,000 guilders in 1565, payable in Wetzlar on Wednesday after Pentecost each time. Hesse fulfilled its payment obligations. It was significant, and it meant recognition of the legal claims of the Counts of Nassau, that they were allowed to use the title Count of Katzenelnbogen and the county’s coat of arms, which area, however, definitively came to Hesse. The agreement was signed by Philip of Hesse and William, and also by William’s eldest son Prince William of Orange. It was a provisional agreement; various details continued to be discussed for almost another year. In March 1558, the final agreement was signed at the Imperial Diet in Frankfurt. In April of that year, the ceded districts of Driedorf, Ellar, Hadamar and Camberg were transferred by Hesse to Nassau. This ended a dispute that had lasted more than half a century and had cost large sums of money. This can be roughly measured by the fact that Nassau had consulted 54 lawyers for the lawsuits alone. The greatest burden rested on William’s shoulders, who was assisted in the final years by his eldest son. Nevertheless, for William the settlement brought with it a considerable enlargement of his territory, giving the area to the right of the River Lahn a considerably greater unity and completion and, with the acquisition of Altweilnau, Camberg and Wehrheim across the Lahn, his territory was now bordering the territory of the Walramian Line of the House of Nassau.

The dispute over the County of Katzenelnbogen, however, the Counts of Nassau had not only fought because of the inheritance, but also as a representative of the Imperial Estates and as an advocate of a rule of law against the emerging power states of absolute princes, of which the Landgraves of Hesse proved to be the typical representatives. The preservation of the Imperial Estates became a life task for the House of Nassau, and it may not be an exaggeration to say that without the stronghold Nassau, princely power would have removed the influence of the imperial immediate nobility, clergy and perhaps even the free imperial cities on the fate of the nation. With that, the Holy Roman Empire would have irrevocably disintegrated, but at the same time social forms of development would have emerged, as in France, for example, which were eventually to lead to a popular revolt. In the dispute over the County of Katzenelnbogen with a much stronger opponent, the Counts of Nassau acquired the strength that later enabled them to withstand the great test in the Netherlands. Although it cannot be denied that the idea of the Empire, of which the counts and other Imperial Estates were the bearers, had become bloodless in the 16th century, by opposing a princely policy that neglected the Emperor and the Empire, they saved both. The leaders of the counts and lords in this struggle were almost without exception Counts of Nassau, as if destined to do so. To show the world that they were entitled to this resistance, William’s counsellor Wilhelm Knüttel, who held office in Siegen, compiled a work on the genealogy of the House of Nassau. Although it does not hold up to modern-day scrutiny, it did have an impact at the time, mainly due to his appeal to the charisma (royal salvation) that had come to Nassau through Roman King Adolf. The Counts of Nassau were helped by similar ideas in a writing prepared by the imperial counsellor Lazarus von Schwendi. Especially impressed were the counts from around the County of Nassau, namely those who had united in the Wetterauer Grafenverein.

Final years, death, burial and succession
The settlement of the dispute over the County of Katzenelnbogen and the fact that Landgrave Philip of Hesse, living in notorious bigamy, decreed the partition of Hesse at the insistence of his second wife, thereby renouncing the previously envisaged great state of Hesse that he had hitherto pursued, removed all obstacles to a settlement between Hesse and Nassau. Fact is that since then the relationship between Nassau and Hesse developed increasingly favourably. But fact also remains that the County of Nassau was financially ruined after this dispute. Against the annual income of 50,000 guilders, there were debts of 512,576 guilders. Annual interest of 25,684 guilders constituted half of the total income. Although the settlement of Frankfurt required Hesse to pay Nassau a large sum in instalments for the County of Katzenelnbogen, these payments were nowhere near enough to cover the debts.

Despite all debts, William continued to give celebrations at court. All these celebrations, however glorious, were surpassed by a feast that the castle and the city of Dillenburg have hardly experienced to this day, the triple wedding celebrations on 6 June 1559. His son John married the young Landgravine Elisabeth of Leuchtenberg, and his daughters Anne and Elisabeth married the counts Albert of Nassau-Weilburg and Konrad of Solms-Braunfels respectively. The splendour of this feast, about which a participant and eyewitness,  Gottfried Hatzfeld, has left an unfortunately only partially preserved rhymed account, was especially favoured by the circumstance that the just preceding end of the Katzenelnbogische Erbfolgestreit had yielded William large sums of cash, from which it can be deduced that the gifts to both daughters Anne and Elisabeth were also financed from it. The background to this magnificent feast, in which 1235 horses had to be accommodated in and around Dillenburg, was the castle, which, after many years of work, had been considerably enlarged and artfully decorated, and its architectural beauty was particularly praised by Hatzfeld with the words ʻWenn es nit hett diesen herren, eines Keysers haus wer es mit ehrenʼ (ʻif it did not belong to this lord, an Emperorʼs house it would be with honourʼ). William had the so-called new construction of Dillenburg Castle built in the years 1550–1553, intended as living quarters for the count's family. He paid the utmost attention to the castleʼs furnishings, and had previously received a strong impulse for the artistic decoration of the numerous rooms from his brother Henry, inspired by the Spanish-Burgundian court at the Dutch noble courts.

William outlived the ʻFriedensschlußʼ with Hesse by only two years. He died in Dillenburg on 6 October 1559. One day before his death, in his last will, signed at Dillenburg, he recorded that he wished to be buried ‘in der Kirchen eine, Siegen oder Dillenburg’ (‘in the church of Siegen or Dillenburg’), according to the wishes of his wife Juliane and his sons John, Louis, Adolf and Henry, without pomp and circumstance, but with a Leichenpredigt. The date of his funeral has remained unknown. His eldest son could not attend the funeral. William was succeeded by his sons John, Louis, Adolf and Henry. Already in 1560, they divided the county, but John exercised the administration on behalf of his younger brothers. Their father had signed a house treaty with John III for this purpose in 1554.

Explanation of the nicknames

The Elder
In the time that William lived, it was not yet customary for reigning counts to be numbered, as was the case with kings. When father and son had the same given name, it was necessary to distinguish both. In this case, the father was referred to as Wilhelm ‘der Ältere’ and the son as Wilhelm ‘der Jüngere’. This is similar to the still-used custom that, when father and son bear the same given name and surname, they are distinguished by the addition of the respective abbreviations Sr. (senior) and Jr. (junior) after the surname. The younger William later became known as William the Silent, Prince of Orange.

The Rich
It cannot be said with certainty what the nickname ‘the Rich’ refers to, nor when William became known by this name. Dutch historian  gives as explanation for the nickname: “possibly because of his richness of children, for he was by no means wealthy”. The Dutch hagiographies about William ‘the Silent’ have no doubt, according to them the nickname refers “to his richness of children, for his financial prosperity was by no means remarkable”. However, this explanation can easily be debunked, as German historian  shows quite clearly that William was already called ‘der Reiche Nassau’ at the time of the German Peasants’ War in 1524–1525. And at that time, William had only one daughter, which can hardly be called a richness of children.
German historian Richard Kolb offers another explanation: “His contemporaries, perhaps after the Katzenelnbogen inheritance, called him the Rich”. One could add that with an annual income of 50,000 guilders, as well as his possession of many iron smelters, farmsteads, meadows and arable land, William would certainly have been considered rich by his subjects.

Marriages and issue

First marriage
William married in Koblenz on 29 May 1506 to Countess Walburga of Egmont (c. 1489 – 7 March 1529), the eldest daughter of Count John III of Egmont and Countess Magdalene of Werdenberg.
From the marriage of William and Walburga, the following children were born:
 Elisabeth (Siegen, October 1515 – Siegen (?), January 1523).
 Magdalene (Siegen, 6 October 1522 – 18 August 1567), married on 16 July 1538 to Count  (1514 – 4 December 1578).

Second marriage

William remarried in Siegen on 20 September 1531 to Countess Juliane of Stolberg-Wernigerode (Stolberg, 15 February 1506 – Dillenburg, 18 June 1580), daughter of Count Bodo III of Stolberg-Wernigerode and Countess Anne of Eppstein-Königstein. Juliane previously married on 9 June 1523 to Count Philip II of Hanau-Münzenberg (17 August 1501 – 28 March 1529).
From the marriage of William and Juliane, the following children were born:
 Prince William I ‘the Silent’ of Orange (Dillenburg, 24 April 1533 – murdered in Delft, 10 July 1584), succeeded his cousin René in 1544 as Prince of Orange, Count of Vianden, etc. He married:
 in Buren on 8 July 1551 to Anna van Egmont (Grave, March 1533 – Breda, 24 March 1558), Countess of Buren, Leerdam and Lingen, etc.
 in Leipzig on 24 August 1561 to Duchess Anne of Saxony (Dresden, 23 December 1544 – Dresden, 18 December 1577). The marriage was dissolved in early 1571.
 in Den Briel on 12 June 1575 to Duchess Charlotte de Bourbon-Montpensier (1546/47 – Antwerp, 5 May 1582).
 in Antwerp on 12 April 1583 to Countess Louise de Coligny (Châtillon-sur-Loing, 23 September 1555 – Fontainebleau, 13 November 1620).
 Hermanna (9 August 1534 – died young).
 Count John VI ‘the Elder’ (Dillenburg, 22 November 1536 – Dillenburg, 8 October 1606), succeeded his father in 1559 and inherited the County of Nassau-Beilstein in 1561. He married:
 in Dillenburg on 6 or 16 June 1559 to Landgravine Elisabeth of Leuchtenberg (March 1537 – Dillenburg, 6 July 1579).
 in Dillenburg on 13 September 1580 to Countess palatine  (Simmern, 9 October 1556 – Dillenburg, 26 January 1586).
 in Berleburg on 14 June 1586 with Countess Johannette of Sayn-Wittgenstein (15 February 1561 – Hadamar, 13 April 1622).
 Count Louis (Dillenburg, 10 January 1538 – killed in action in the Battle of Mookerheyde, 14 April 1574), succeeded his father in 1559 and inherited the County of Nassau-Beilstein in 1561.
 Mary (Dillenburg, 18 March 1539 – , 18/28 May 1599), married in Moers on 11 November 1556 to Count Willem IV van den Bergh (’s-Heerenberg, 24 December 1537 – Ulft Castle, 6 November 1586).
 Count Adolf (Siegen, 11 July 1540 – killed in action in the Battle of Heiligerlee, 23 May 1568), succeeded his father in 1559 and inherited the County of Nassau-Beilstein in 1561.
 Anne (Dillenburg, 21 September 1541 – Weilburg, 12 February 1616), married in Dillenburg on 6 or 16 June 1559 to Count Albert of Nassau-Weilburg (26 December 1537 – Ottweiler, 11 November 1593).
 Elisabeth (Dillenburg, 25 September 1542 – 18 November 1603), married in Dillenburg on 6 or 16 June 1559 to Count Konrad of Solms-Braunfels (17 June 1540 – 27 December 1592).
 Catherine (Dillenburg, 29 December 1543 – 25 December 1624), married in Arnstadt on 17 November 1560 to Count Günther XLI ‘Bellicosus’ of Schwarzburg-Arnstadt (Arnstadt, 25 September 1529 – Antwerp, 23 May 1583).
 Juliane (Dillenburg, 10 August 1546 – 31 August 1588), married on 14 June 1575 to Count Albert VII of Schwarzburg-Rudolstadt (16 January 1537 – 10 April 1605).
 Magdalene (Dillenburg, 15 December 1547 – Öhringen, 16 May 1633), married on 27 January 1567 to Count Wolfgang of Hohenlohe-Weikersheim (14 June 1546 – Weikersheim, 28 March 1610).
 Count Henry (Dillenburg, 15 October 1550 – killed in action in the Battle of Mookerheyde, 14 April 1574), succeeded his father in 1559 and inherited the County of Nassau-Beilstein in 1561.

Illegitimate child
William had one illegitimate son:
 Godfrey of Nassau (died , Good Friday 1582), Lord of Löhnberg and Camberg, commander at Beilstein 1561–1564, Hofmeister at Dillenburg 1566–1567. He married:
 to Anne of Wied.
 in 1557 to Irmgard Schlaun.
 c. 1577 to Ursula von Bergen genannt Kessel (died c. 1611).

Progenitor of the Dutch royal house
William is considered to be the progenitor of the Dutch royal house. Through his eldest son, the stadtholders Maurice, Frederick Henry, William II and William III of the Dutch Republic are descendants in male line from William. And through his second son, the same applies to the stadtholders William IV and William V and the Kings William I, William II, William III and Queen Wilhelmina of the Netherlands.

Ancestors

Notes

References

Sources
 
 
 
 
 
 
 
 
 
 
 
 
 
 
 
 
 
 
 
  (1882). Het vorstenhuis Oranje-Nassau. Van de vroegste tijden tot heden (in Dutch). Leiden: A.W. Sijthoff/Utrecht: J.L. Beijers.

External links

 Nassau. In: Medieval Lands. A prosopography of medieval European noble and royal families, by Charles Cawley.
 Nassau Part 4. In: An Online Gotha, by Paul Theroff.
 Nassau-Dillenburg, Wilhelm der Reiche Graf von (in German). In: Landesgeschichtliches Informationssystem Hessen (LAGIS) (in German).
 Portret van Willem de Rijke (in Dutch). In: Koninklijke Verzamelingen (Royal Dutch Collections) (in Dutch).

|-

1487 births
1559 deaths
William 01, Count of Nassau-Siegen
William 01, Count of Nassau-Siegen
German Lutherans
William 01, Count of Nassau-Siegen
People from Dillenburg
Schmalkaldic League
William the Silent
15th-century German nobility
16th-century German people